A liana is a type of vine.

Liana may also refer to:

 Liana (name), a given name and persons with it
 Suzuki Aerio, a car
 Liana (planarian), a genus of land planarians.
 Liana (novel), by Martha Gellhorn

See also
Lianna (disambiguation)